Philip Hough (31 August 1924 – 4 September 2014) was an English cricketer.  Hough was a right-handed batsman who bowled leg break googly.  His birthplace was Macclesfield, Cheshire.

Hough made his Minor Counties Championship debut for Cheshire in 1949 against  Staffordshire.  From 1949 to 1959, he represented the Cheshire and the Lancashire Second XI in a combined total of 36 Minor Counties Championship matches, the last of which came against Northumberland.

In 1962, Savin joined Wiltshire, where he made his Minor Counties Championship debut for the county against Dorset.  From 1962 to 1966, he represented the county in 12 Championship matches, the last of which came against Dorset.

Savin also represented Wiltshire in a single List-A match against Nottinghamshire in the 1965 Gillette Cup during which he scored 25 runs before being caught and bowled by Andrew Corran.

Hough later stood as an umpire in 25 Minor Counties Championship matches between 1967 and 1972.

References

External links
Philip Hough at Cricinfo
Philip Hough at CricketArchive

1924 births
2014 deaths
Sportspeople from Macclesfield
People from Cheshire
English cricketers
Cheshire cricketers
Wiltshire cricketers
English cricket umpires